Radiant is an unincorporated community located in Madison County, Virginia.

A post office called Radiant has been in operation since 1895. It is unclear why the name "Radiant" was applied to this community.

Locust Grove Baptist Church is a historically Black church in Radiant.  In 1974, the pastor was Rev. Major Gorham, and Mrs. Ruth Harris was clerk.

References

Unincorporated communities in Virginia
Unincorporated communities in Madison County, Virginia